"Siren" is a song recorded by South Korean singer Sunmi for her second EP, Warning. Sunmi produced the song with Frants, and it was released on September 4, 2018, by Makeus Entertainment as the lead single from the EP. "Siren" is a pop track, in which Sunmi sings lyrics about a lover whose image of her doesn't fit with reality, resulting in her ending the relationship. 

The song marks the final release of Sunmi's warning-themed trilogy that started with "Gashina" and continued with "Heroine". It topped all major charts in South Korea and debuted and peaked at number 1 on the Gaon Digital Chart, becoming Sunmi's second number-one single in South Korea.

Background and release
About two to three years ago, “Siren” had been considered as a potential title track for Wonder Girls, but the song was ultimately shelved because JYP Entertainment decided that it “wouldn't sound as great if arranged for a band" since the Wonder Girls were promoting as a band and not as a dance group at the time, and "Why So Lonely" was chosen as the title track instead. "Siren" was ultimately released on September 4, 2018, and serves as the lead single from Sunmi's second EP Warning. Sunmi announced the song via her social media accounts on August 26, 2018:

Composition 
"Siren" was written by Sunmi and produced by her and Frants. It runs for three minutes and nineteen seconds. "Siren" was described as "an ‘80s-evoking ambient pop track". Lyrically, it is about a lover whose image of her doesn't fit with reality, resulting in her ending the relationship.

Commercial performance 
"Siren" achieved the perfect all-kill status, a status where a song is simultaneously topping all charts, both daily and realtime. The song topped Gaon Digital Chart for a total of 2 consecutive weeks, becoming her second number-one single in South Korea.

Music video
The music video, directed by Choi Yongseok, was released along with the song and features different facets of Sunmi, all of which make one version face the reality of her relationship. Sunmi performs a choreographed powerful dance and also appears in several looks,  with Billboard stating that the outfits "evoke mythological creatures and mermaids, while hair accessories like crowns and a “priority” shipping label hair-tie emphasize the domineering nature of the track".

The video currently has over 50 million views.

Credits and personnel
Credits adapted from Tidal.

Sunmi - vocals, songwriter, producer
 Frants – producer

Charts

Weekly charts

Monthly charts

Year-end charts

Accolades

Awards and nominations

Music program awards

Release history

See also
 List of Gaon Digital Chart number ones of 2018
 List of Inkigayo Chart winners (2018)
 List of Kpop Hot 100 number ones
 List of M Countdown Chart winners (2018)

References

2018 singles
2018 songs
Sunmi songs
Gaon Digital Chart number-one singles
Korean-language songs
Billboard Korea K-Pop number-one singles
Music videos directed by Lumpens
Songs written by Sunmi